Amadou Hampâté Bâ (1900/1901 – 15 May 1991) was a Malian writer, historian and ethnologist. He was an influential figure in twentieth-century African literature and cultural heritage. He was a champion of Africa's oral tradition and traditional knowledge and is remembered for the saying: "whenever an old man dies, it is as though a library were burning down."

Biography
Amadou Hampâté Bâ was born to an aristocratic Fula family in Bandiagara, the largest city in Dogon territory and the capital of the precolonial Masina Empire. At the time of his birth, the area was known as French Sudan as part of colonial French West Africa, which was formally established a few years before his birth. After his father's death, he was adopted by his mother's second husband, Tidjani Amadou Ali Thiam of the Toucouleur ethnic group. He first attended the Qur'anic school run by Tierno Bokar, a dignitary of the Tijaniyyah brotherhood, then transferred to a French school at Bandiagara, then to one at Djenné. In 1915, he ran away from school and rejoined his mother at Kati, where he resumed his studies.

In 1921, he turned down entry into the école normale in Gorée. As a punishment, the governor appointed him to Ouagadougou with the role he later described as that of "an essentially precarious and revocable temporary writer". From 1922 to 1932, he held several posts in the colonial administration in Upper Volta, now Burkina Faso, and from 1932 to 1942 in Bamako. In 1933, he took six months' leave to visit Tierno Bokar, his spiritual leader. (See also:Sufi studies)

In 1942, he was appointed to the Institut Français d’Afrique Noire (IFAN — the French Institute of Black Africa) in Dakar, thanks to the benevolence of Théodore Monod, its director. At IFAN, he made ethnological surveys and collected traditions. For 15 years he devoted himself to research, which would later lead to the publication of his work L'Empire peul de Macina (The Fula Empire of Macina). In 1951, he obtained a UNESCO grant, enabling him to travel to Paris and meet with intellectuals from Africanist circles, notably Marcel Griaule.

With Mali's independence in 1960, Bâ founded the Institute of Human Sciences in Bamako, and represented his country at the UNESCO general conferences. In 1962, he was elected to UNESCO's executive council, and in 1966 he helped establish a unified system for the transcription of African languages.

His term in the executive council ended in 1970, and he devoted the remaining years of his life to research and writing. In 1971, he moved to the Marcory suburb of Abidjan, Côte d'Ivoire, and worked on classifying the archives of West African oral tradition that he had accumulated throughout his lifetime, as well as writing his memoirs (Amkoullel l'enfant peul and Oui mon commandant!, both published posthumously).  He died in Abidjan in 1991.

Notable works
L'Empire peul du Macina (1955)—The Fula Empire of Macina
Vie en enseignement de Tierno Bokar, le sage de Bandiagara (1957, rewritten in 1980)—The Life and Education of Tierno Bokar, the Wise Man of Bandiagara
translated into English and published as A Spirit of Tolerance: The Inspiring Life of Tierno Bokar (2008)
Kaïdara, récit initiatique peul (1969)
L'étrange destin du Wangrin (1973)—The Strange Destiny of Wangrin, 
awarded the Grand prix de littérature d’Afrique noire (1974)
L'Éclat de la grande étoile (1974)—The Brightness of the Great Star
Jésus vu par un musulman (1976)—Jesus, as Viewed by a Muslim
 Petit Bodiel (conte peul) et version en prose de Kaïdara (1977)—Little Bodiel (a Fula tale) and a prose version of Kaïdara
Njeddo Dewal, mère de la calamité (1985)—Njeddo Dewal, Mother of Calamity
La poignée de poussière, contes et récits du Mali (1987)—A Handful of Dust, Malian Stories
Kaïdara (1988)—Kaydara: The Mysterious Journey

Memoirs 

Amkoullel, l'enfant peul (1991)—Amkoullel, the Fula Child
Oui mon commandant! (1994)—Yes, My Commander (published posthumously)

References

Bibliography 

 Kassé, Maguèye, (2020). « Le maître de la parole. Vie et œuvre d’Amadou Hampâté Bâ », in BEROSE -  International Encyclopaedia of the Histories of Anthropology, Paris.

Further reading 

Dielika Diallo. "Hampate Ba: the great conciliator". UNESCO Courier, January 1992.
Biography and guide to collected works: African Studies Centre, Leiden
Malian ministry of culture, dossier for the hundredth anniversary of the birth of Amadou Hampâté Bâ (in French)

External links 
 Publishers website
Resources related to research : BEROSE - International Encyclopaedia of the Histories of Anthropology. "Bâ, Amadou Hampâté (1901-1991)", Paris, 2020.  (ISSN 2648-2770) `

1900s births
1991 deaths
Fula people
Malian non-fiction writers
People from Mopti Region
Malian male writers
20th-century male writers
20th-century non-fiction writers
Male non-fiction writers